Ivanjkovci  is a settlement in the Municipality of Ormož in northeastern Slovenia. The area traditionally belonged to the Styria region and is now included in the Drava Statistical Region.

The railway line from Maribor to Murska Sobota runs through the settlement.

References

External links

Ivanjkovci on Geopedia

Populated places in the Municipality of Ormož